Zanni is a surname. Notable people with the surname include:

 Alessandro Zanni (born 1984), Italian rugby union footballer
 Chiara Zanni (born 1978), Canadian actress
 Dom Zanni (born 1932), former right-handed pitcher in Major League Baseball
 Matteo Zanni (born 1987), Italian ice dancer
 Reto Zanni (born 1980), Swiss football player
 Marc Zanni Vilamitjana (born 1969), Spanish voice actor